Metylovice (in 1939–1945 Quittendorf) is a municipality and village in Frýdek-Místek District in the Moravian-Silesian Region of the Czech Republic. It has about 1,800 inhabitants. It is located in the Moravian-Silesian Foothills.

History
The first written mention of Metylovice is from 1299.

Sights
The most important monument is the Church of All Saints. It was built in Gothic style in 1577 on the site of an older wooden church, and later baroque modified.

Twin towns – sister cities

Metylovice is twinned with:
 Krásno nad Kysucou, Slovakia

References

External links

 

Villages in Frýdek-Místek District